A community development corporation (CDC) is a not-for-profit organization incorporated to provide programs, offer services and engage in other activities that promote and support community development. CDCs usually serve a geographic location such as a neighborhood or a town. They often focus on serving lower-income residents or struggling neighborhoods. They can be involved in a variety of activities including economic development, education, community organizing and real estate development. These organizations are often associated with the development of affordable housing.

The first community development corporation in the United States was the Bedford Stuyvesant Restoration Corporation.

Activities
Real estate development
Affordable housing
Economic development
Small business lending
Small business technical assistance
Small business incubation (i.e. provision of space at low or no cost to start-up businesses)
Education
Early childhood education
Workforce training
Nonprofit incubation
Fundraising for local causes as a corporate donor, public charity, or foundation
Financing Housing cooperatives or other cooperatives
Fiscal sponsorship of community-based associations
Youth and leadership development
Advocacy
Sustainable development advocacy
Locally-owned business advocacy
Environmental justice and brownfields redevelopment
Community planning
Master planning for retail and community development
Community organizing
Lessening neighborhood tensions
Facilitating community and stakeholder participation in local programs and activities
Facilitating community access to targeted grants

In some jurisdictions in the United States, a CDC is by definition targeted towards direct investment in the community, while a "community development advocacy organization" is a category eligible for recognition as a tax-exempt charity or service organization.

Notable examples 
Abyssinian Development Corporation
Accion USA
Bedford Stuyvesant Restoration Corporation
Community Development Corporation of Oregon
Chicanos Por La Causa
Mexicantown Community Development Corporation
Coalfield Development Corporation
Sunshine State Economic Development Corporation
Youngstown Neighborhood Development Corporation

References

Bibliography

External links
 http://community-wealth.org/strategies/panel/cdcs/index.html
 https://web.archive.org/web/20150417001825/http://www.southfloridacdc.org/who/development/

Non-profit organizations based in the United States
Community development organizations